Shimomura is a Japanese surname. Notable people with the surname include:

, Japanese volleyball player
, Japanese politician
, Japanese Nihonga painter
, Japanese chemical engineer
, Japanese organic chemist and marine biologist
, Japanese economist
Roger Shimomura (born 1939), American artist and academic
, Japanese general
, Japanese footballer
, American physicist and computer security expert
, Japanese composer and pianist
, Japanese footballer and manager

See also
Shimamura

Japanese-language surnames